Kenilworth Park is a  public park in Portland, Oregon's Creston-Kenilworth neighborhood, in the United States. The park was acquired in 1909.

References

External links

 

Creston-Kenilworth, Portland, Oregon
Parks in Portland, Oregon
Protected areas established in 1909